Mikuláš Bakaľa (born 4 January 2001) is a Slovak footballer who plays for Železiarne Podbrezová as a defensive midfielder.

Club career

FK Železiarne Podbrezová
Bakaľa made his professional debut for Železiarne Podbrezová against ŠK Slovan Bratislava on 16 July 2022.

International career
Bakaľa was first recognised in Slovak senior national team nomination in November 2022 by Francesco Calzona being listed as an alternate for two friendly fixtures against Montenegro and Marek Hamšík's retirement match against Chile. He remained in the position of an alternate for prospective national team players' training camp in early December.

References

External links
 FK Železiarne Podbrezová official club profile 
 
 Futbalnet profile 
 

2001 births
Living people
People from Dolný Kubín
Sportspeople from the Žilina Region
Slovak footballers
Slovakia youth international footballers
Association football midfielders
FK Železiarne Podbrezová players
Slovak Super Liga players
2. Liga (Slovakia) players